The Johnston Collection is a museum in East Melbourne, Australia. In recent years The Collection has invited  creatives from the broader visual arts and design communities to re-interpret the collection through a regular program of re-installation and interventions of the permanent collection and has been the recipient of a number of industry awards.  

The museum is an "exhibition house" and displays a collection of English Georgian, Regency and Louis XV artworks that were a bequest from William Robert Johnston (1911-1986), a prominent antique dealer, real estate investor and collector, to the people of Victoria.  The Collection is displayed in a regularly changed domestic setting, in his former residence, Fairhall, an historic East Melbourne townhouse.

Fairhall

Fairhall is a two storey brick house constructed in 1860, which now houses The Johnston Collection of fine and decorative art. Constructed in 1860, and originally named Cadzow, the house was purchased by William Johnston in 1952. Johnston occupied the house from 1972 until his death in 1986. Internally the structure of Fairhall remains essentially as Johnston left it. Under his ownership, the house was remodelled to simulate the appearance of a Georgian townhouse. These alterations included changes to the fenestration, the replacement of the front door and the insertion of a semicircular fanlight. The house and its collection were bequeathed to the people of Victoria by Johnston in 1986.

Fairhall was converted into the house museum, and a courtyard garden was designed by John Patrick in the English manner to highlight Johnston’s love of gardening. In accordance with Johnston’s wishes, the Collection is displayed in a domestic setting within Fairhall, without labels, ropes or barriers. All visitors are conducted through the house by volunteer guides. There is an established tradition of re-dressing and decorating Fairhall, initiated by Johnston himself. Johnston often brought his decorating skills to the fore, rearranging the furniture, not only in Fairhall but also his country property Chandpara and his shop Kent Antiques in High St, Armadale, to make little vignettes within the spaces. 

Today, the Collection is rearranged for three themed tours per year including the popular Christmas Season re-arrangement. In the past guest curators have been invited to interpret the collection and the space. These have included Lynne Landy and Lady Potter, fashion designer Akira Isogawa, decorator Robert Thomson, and antique dealers Jamie Allpress and Francis Dunn.

Gallery

References 

Anthony Knight, The Johnston Collection, The W.R. Johnston Trust, 1997
The Johnston Collection history
ADFAS
East Melbourne Historical Society

External links 

Art museums and galleries in Melbourne
Decorative arts museums
Historic house museums in Victoria (Australia)
1990 establishments in Australia